The Phantom Rider is a 1936 American Western film serial directed by Ray Taylor for Universal and starring Buck Jones and Marla Shelton.

Plot

Cast
 Buck Jones as Buck Grant
 Marla Shelton as Mary Grayson
 George Cooper as Spooky
 Diana Gibson as Helen Moore
 Harry Woods as Harvey Delaney
 Frank LaRue as Judge Holmes
 Eddie Gribbon as Sheriff Mark
 Matt McHugh as Agent Shorty
 Helen Shipman as Lizzie
 Joey Ray as Steve Scott
 Lafe McKee as Jeff Grayson
 Jim Mason as Dirk, a henchman
 Charles King as Keeler, a henchman
 Clem Bevans as Mr Hudson
 Wally Wales as Lew, a henchman

Production

Stunts
 Cliff Lyons
 George Plues
 Wally West 
 Jay Wilsey

Chapter titles
 Dynamite
 The Maddened Herd
 The Brink of Disaster
 The Phantom Rides
 Trapped by Outlaws
 Shot Down
 Stark Terror
 The Night Attack
 The Indians Attack
 Human Targets
 The Shaft of Doom
 Flaming Gold
 Crashing Timbers
 The Last Chance
 The Outlaw's Vengeance
Source:

See also
 List of film serials
 List of film serials by studio

References

External links

1936 films
American black-and-white films
1930s English-language films
Universal Pictures film serials
Films directed by Ray Taylor
1936 Western (genre) films
American Western (genre) films
Films with screenplays by George H. Plympton
1930s American films